Silouan the Athonite (Russian: Силуан Афонский) also sometimes referred to as Silouan of Athos, Saint Silvanus the Athonite or Staretz Silouan (January 17, 1866 – September 24, 1938) was an Eastern Orthodox monk of Russian origin, born Simeon Ivanovich Antonov who was a poet and monk of the St. Panteleimon Monastery.

Life

He was born Simeon Ivanovich Antonov, of Russian Orthodox parents who came from the village of Sovsk in Imperial Russia's Tambov Governorate. At the age of twenty-seven, after a period of military service in the Imperial Russian Army, he left his native Russia and came to the monastic state of Mount Athos (an autonomous peninsula in Greece) where he became a monk at the Monastery of St Panteleimon, known as "Rossikon", an Orthodox monastery that houses Russian monks yet is, as all the Athonite monasteries, under the jurisdiction of the Patriarch of Constantinople. There, was given the name Silouan (the Russian version of the Biblical name Silvanus).

An ardent ascetic, he received the grace of unceasing prayer and saw Christ in a vision. After long years of spiritual trial, he acquired great humility and inner stillness. He prayed and wept for the whole world as for himself, and he put the highest value on love for enemies. He became widely known as an elder. St Silouan died on September 24, 1938. His memory is celebrated on September 24.

Though barely literate, he was sought out by pilgrims for his wise counsel. His writings were edited by his disciple and pupil, Archimandrite Sophrony. Father Sophrony has written the life of the saint along with a record of St. Silouan's teachings in the book Saint Silouan the Athonite. His text Adam's lament is set as a choir piece by the Estonian composer Arvo Pärt.

Starets Silouan was canonized by the Ecumenical Patriarchate in 1987.

Quotations
 Those who dislike and reject their fellow-man are impoverished in their being. They do not know the true God, who is all-embracing love.
 Keep your mind in hell and do not despair, said to be a teaching Jesus Christ told him in a dialogue they had. After demons surrounding him weren't allowing him to pray, he looked up at the sky and said: Lord, you see that I want to pray to you, but they won't let me. The Lord then appeared to him and told him: The prideful ones always suffer this way. So Siluan asked: Lord, how can I become humble? And the Lord replied: Keep your mind in hell and do not despair.
 The soul that is in all things devoted to the will of God rests quiet in Him, for she knows of experience and from the Holy Scriptures that the Lord loves us much and watches over our souls, quickening all things by His grace in peace and love. Nothing troubles the man who is given over to the will of God, be it illness, poverty or persecution. He knows that the Lord in His mercy is solicitous for us. The Holy Spirit, whom the soul knows, is witness therefore. But the proud and the self-willed do not want to surrender to God's will because they like their own way, and that is harmful for the soul. (From the Life and Teachings of Elder Siluan by Bishop Alexander and Natalia Bufius translated by Anatoly Shmelev)
 The condition of peace among men is that each should keep a consciousness of his own wrongdoing
 Understand two thoughts, and fear them. One says, "You are a saint," and the other, "You won't be saved." Both of these thoughts are from the enemy, and there is no truth in them. But think this way: I am a great sinner, but the Lord is merciful. He loves people very much, and He will forgive my sins.

References

Archimandrite Sophrony. Saint Silouan the Athonite. St. Vladimir's Seminary Press. 
Bishop Alexander and Natalia Bufius; translated by Anatoly Shmelev. The Life and Teachings of Elder Siluan''. Missionary Leaflet #EA17 Holy Trinity Orthodox Mission, 466 Foothill Blvd, Box 397, La Cañada Flintridge, CA 91011

External links
 Photographs of Saint Silouan the Athonite
  Silouan the Athonite
 On the Will of God by Staretz Silouan of Mt. Athos
 The Theology of St. Silouan, Archim. Zacharias Zacharou (video lecture)

1866 births
1938 deaths
19th-century Christian saints
20th-century Christian saints
19th-century Christian mystics
20th-century Christian mystics
Athonite Fathers
Eastern Orthodox mystics
Russian saints of the Eastern Orthodox Church
Hesychasts
Saints of modern Greece
Russian male poets
Greek male writers
20th-century Russian poets
20th-century Greek poets
20th-century Russian male writers
Greek saints of the Eastern Orthodox Church
People associated with St. Panteleimon Monastery
Starets